Ri Song-chol  (born April 5, 1986) is a North Korean former competitive figure skater and politician. He is the 2008 Asian Figure Skating Trophy champion and a five-time North Korean national champion (2003, 2007, 2008, 2009, and 2010). He competed at the 2010 Winter Olympics in Vancouver, British Columbia, Canada, where he was the flag bearer for North Korea at the opening ceremony.

Ri was elected to North Korea's Supreme People's Assembly in the 2009 North Korean parliamentary election, representing the 418th Electoral District. He did not renew his seat in the following elections.

Programs

Competitive highlights
JGP: Junior Grand Prix

References

External links
 

1986 births
Living people
Figure skaters at the 2010 Winter Olympics
North Korean male single skaters
Olympic figure skaters of North Korea
Sportspeople from Pyongyang
Figure skaters at the 2003 Asian Winter Games
Figure skaters at the 2007 Asian Winter Games
Figure skaters at the 2011 Asian Winter Games